Manimekalai is a Tamil epic composed by Chithalai Chathanar.

Manimekalai (alternatively spelt Manimegalai) may refer to:
 Manimekalai (1940 film), a 1940 film adaptation of the epic
 Manimekalai (1959 film), a 1959 film adaptation of the epic
 Manimegalai, an Indian VJ